Eve Marie Shahoian is an American classical crossover and jazz singer-songwriter. She performs as 'Eve Marie' or 'Eve Shahoian' and is the creator-composer of the album Waiting for You.

Early life
Eve Marie Shahoian grew up in Oakland, California. She was considered a child vocal prodigy who began performing regularly in the 1980s on television, concerts, symphony, and musical theater. She attended Holy Names University in Oakland and graduated in 2004 with a master's degree in Vocal pedagogy.

Career 
During her early singing career, Shahoian appeared on The Tonight Show, The Mike Douglas Show, Just Kidding, San Francisco Press Club, French Club, and Circle Star Theater, and was a featured guest on TV and radio stations KGO, KPIX, KRON, KTVU, and KEMO. Shahoian has performed as a soloist several times with the Oakland Symphony. As a child, Shahoian performed with the Oakland Symphony under the direction of the late Calvin Simmons. As a teen, she performed with the Oakland Symphony's maestro Maxim Shostakovich. As an adult, she has performed at the Rrazz Room in San Francisco.   She continues to compose, perform, and teach music in the San Francisco Bay area.

Television appearances 
 1980 The Tonight Show with Johnny Carson (Episode 2405)
 1980 The Mike Douglas Show 
 1980 Just Kidding
 1981 That's Incredible
 1983 The John Davidson Show

Discography

Recognition

References

Living people
Year of birth missing (living people)
American women jazz singers
American jazz singers
Crossover (music)
American women singer-songwriters
American child musicians
American singer-songwriters
21st-century American women